Thomas Atkinson (August 6, 1807 – January 4, 1881) was the third Episcopal Bishop of North Carolina.

Early life
Atkinson was born in Dinwiddie County, Virginia, the son of Robert Atkinson and Mary Tabb Mayo Atkinson.  He attended Yale University and Hampden-Sydney College, graduating from the latter in 1825.  Upon graduation, he studied law under Judge Henry St. George Tucker at Winchester Law School and practiced law for eight years before turning to theology. In January 1828, he married Josepha Gwinn Wilder, with whom he had three children.

Parish ministry
Atkinson was ordained deacon by the Rt. Rev. William Meade on November 18, 1836, and ordained priest the following year.  As deacon, Atkinson served as assistant minister at Christ Church in Norfolk, Virginia.  After his ordination to the priesthood, he became rector of St. Paul's Church in Norfolk.  In 1839, he moved to Lynchburg to become rector of St. Paul's Church in that town, remaining there for five years.

In 1843, Atkinson moved again, to Maryland, where he became the rector of St. Peter's Church in Baltimore.  In 1843 and 1846, he was elected bishop of Indiana, declining the honor both times. In 1852, he became rector of Grace Church in the same city, a new parish organized, in part, by members of St. Peter's.

Bishop of North Carolina
Atkinson was elected Bishop of North Carolina on May 28, 1853, following the resignation of Bishop Ives in December the previous year. He was consecrated on October 17, 1853, by Bishops Thomas Church Brownell, Charles Pettit McIlvaine, George Washington Doane, James Hervey Otey, George Trevor Spencer, and John Medley. Atkinson became the 58th bishop in the Episcopal Church. As bishop, Atkinson founded a church school for boys in Raleigh and the Ravenscroft School in Asheville. He urged the religious instruction of slaves. Initially opposing secession, after the American Civil War began, Bishop Atkinson affiliated with the Protestant Episcopal Church in the Confederate States of America.

After the war, in 1866, Atkinson recommended placing the operation of black Episcopal churches fully in the hands of black clergymen, and the Diocesan Convention passed a series of resolutions doing so. Two years later, he opened the Episcopal school for blacks near Raleigh that eventually became St. Augustine's College. In 1867, he attended the first Lambeth Conference at Lambeth Palace. As his health declined, Atkinson requested the election of an assistant bishop, and Theodore Benedict Lyman was elected to that position in 1873.  Atkinson died on January 4, 1881, at his home in Wilmington; he was buried on January 7 within St. James Episcopal Church in Wilmington, North Carolina.

The Episcopal Church of the Holy Comforter in Charlotte is the memorial church of Bishop Thomas Atkinson.

Notes

References

External links
 Works by or about Thomas Atkinson (1807–1881) at Internet Archive.
 Works by or about Thomas Atkinson at Project Canterbury.

1807 births
1881 deaths
Bishops in North Carolina
Episcopal Church in North Carolina
19th-century American Episcopalians
Episcopal bishops of North Carolina
19th-century American clergy
Winchester Law School alumni